Andrei Evgenyevich Snesarev (Russian: Андрей Евгеньевич Снесарев; 13 December 1865 – 4 December 1937) was a Russian linguist, orientalist and military leader.

Andrei was the son of a Russian Orthodox priest. After attending gymnasium school at Novocherkassk in 1888 he started to studied mathematics at Moscow University. As part of his obligatory military service he gained a commission in the infantry following a period at the Alekseyevsky Junkers Infantry Academy. He soon decided on a military career and attended the Nicholas General Staff Academy. He was then sent to India and also studied at the British Museum, London.

An English translation of his book Afghanistan published in 1921 was published in England in 1924. The book consists of a written version of the lectures he delivered to the Oriental Section of the Military Academy of the Red Army between autumn 1919 and spring 1920.

In 1910 he became Chief of Staff of the 2nd Combined Cossack Division.

Final Years and Death

In 1930 Snesarev was arrested and charged with participating in counter-revolutionary activities.  He was imprisoned in Butyrka Prison then Lubyanka Prison.  He was tried, found guilty, and sentenced to death.  However, Stalin intervened and had his sentenced reduced to ten years imprisonment in the Gulag camp system, first at Svir, then at Solovki prison camp.

He suffered a severe stroke in 1933 which left him partially paralyzed.  He was later taken to Leningrad by his family to receive better medical care and released on parole in September, 1934.  He suffered two more strokes and passed away at a Moscow hospital in December of 1937.

He was re-habilitated in 1958.

References

1865 births
1937 deaths
People from Rossoshansky District
People from Ostrogozhsky Uyezd
Russian generals
Russian military personnel of World War I
Soviet military personnel of the Russian Civil War
Inmates of Solovki prison camp
Soviet rehabilitations